Centrism has a specific meaning within the Marxist movement, referring to a position between revolution and reformism. For instance, the Independent Social Democratic Party of Germany (USPD) and British Independent Labour Party (ILP) were both seen as centrist because they oscillated between advocating reaching a socialist economy through reforms and advocating revolution. The parties that belonged to the so-called Two-and-a-half (International Working Union of Socialist Parties) and Three-and-a-half (International Revolutionary Marxist Centre) Internationals, who could not choose between the reformism of the social democrat Second International and the revolutionary politics of the Communist Third International, were also exemplary of centrism in this sense. They included the Spanish Workers' Party of Marxist Unification (POUM), the Independent Labour Party (ILP) and Poale Zion. 

For Trotskyists and other revolutionary Marxists, the term centrist in this sense has a pejorative association. They often describe centrism in this sense as opportunistic since it argues for a revolution at some point in the future, but urges reformist practices in the meantime. For example, the Communist League described the ILP as a centrist organisation and therefore "politically shapeless and lacking any clear political position on the problems confronting the revolutionary movement"; British Trotskyist leader Ted Grant called the ILP "typical confused centrists"; and the Socialist Workers Party's journal described the ILP as "a centrist organisation whose revolutionary rhetoric was at odds with its reformist practice". A PhD thesis on the ILP summarises this Trotskyist perspective as follows: "the I. L. P. continues to be understood by such authors in terms of Trotsky's own characterisation of the I. L. P., as a centrist party, a party which attempts to stand between 'Marxism and Reformism'".

See also 
 Anti-Stalinist left
 Centrism
 Centrumaši
 Political Centre (Russia)
 Right Opposition
 Third camp
 Twenty-one Conditions

References

Further reading 
 "Two Articles on Centrism" by Leon Trotsky

Eponymous political ideologies
Marxism